The East Tintic Mountains are a mountain range in central Juab, Utah, and Tooele counties in Utah, United States on the east margin of the Great Basin just west of the Wasatch Front about  south-southeast of Salt Lake City. The community of Eureka is an old mining town near the center of the range. U.S. Route 6 Passes through the central part of the range and through Eureka.

The Tintic Mining District is located in the central part of the range. The district was an important producer of silver, gold and base metals during the late 19th and early 20th centuries.  The mountain range, Tintic Valley, and the mining district are named after Chief Tintic of the Goshute.
  
The Tintic Smelter Site, the Sunbeam Mine, and the Silver City Cemetery, listed on the National Register of Historic Places, preserve some remnants of the district.

See also

 List of mountains in Utah
Silver City, Utah

References

External links 

 Boulter Peak, (range center coordinates, listofjohn.com), Photo and Topo Map of peak

Mountain ranges of Utah
Mountain ranges of Juab County, Utah
Mountain ranges of Tooele County, Utah
Mountain ranges of Utah County, Utah